René Sáez (born June 27, 1971 in Havana, Cuba) is a former international swimmer from Cuba, who participated in two consecutive Panamerican Games for his native country, starting in 1987. His best result was a third place in the Men's 200m freestyle at the 1991 Panamerican Games, Havana, Cuba. At the 1993 Central American and Caribbean Games, he won medals in both the 100 and 200 backstroke.

He also participated in the Swimming at the 1991 Pan American Games – Men's 200 metre freestyle and Swimming at the 1991 Pan American Games.

References

Living people
1971 births
Sportspeople from Havana
Cuban male freestyle swimmers
Pan American Games bronze medalists for Cuba
Pan American Games medalists in swimming
Swimmers at the 1991 Pan American Games
Medalists at the 1991 Pan American Games